Delia 'Chikita' Gonzalez (born November 20, 1971) is an American former flyweight female boxer. She has a record of 13-9-4 with 3 knockout wins, although several of her losses have been controversial.

Personal and early life
Gonzalez is Mexican-American, and trained at the gym under her father's guidance. Soon she earned the nickname Chikita, after her favorite boxer, the former 2 time World flyweight champion Humberto "Chiquita" Gonzalez of Mexico.

Career
As a professional, Delia began with a 4-round decision win over Lucy Tellez in Texas. A couple of fights later, she beat Gloria Ramirez twice, once by knockout in the 3rd, and once by decision in 4. Both fights again took place in Texas. Two more wins followed and a title shot came after that, and she beat Klee Fenie in Las Vegas to become the WIBF's world Flyweight champion. She defended her title against Anissa Zamarron winning on points, then met Phoenix's Yvonne Trevino which the judges called a technical draw (word used for tie in boxing). She later met Jolene Blackshear and lost the world title.

She traveled to Cologne, Germany in May 2000 for a bout against Regina Halmich, which she lost. She won four fights after her loss, including two wins over Yolanda Gonzalez.

Later, Gonzales fought in the bantamweight ranks, and in June 2003 lost a fight against Ada Vélez for the WIBA bantamweight title on a seventh-round disqualification.  She has also managed boxer Rebecca Rodriguez.

On March 19, 2004, Gonzalez returned to the ring for a 6-round draw with Johanna Peña-Álvarez.

During 2022, Gonzalez was elected to the International Women's Boxing Hall of Fame.

Professional boxing record

References

External links
Delia Gonzalez, Women Boxing Archive Network
Interview, Dee Williams
Gonzalez v Halmich fight report

American women boxers
Living people
American boxers of Mexican descent
People from Doña Ana County, New Mexico
Boxers from New Mexico
Flyweight boxers
1971 births
World boxing champions
21st-century American women